William Edward Talbot (18 March 1895 – 2 January 1983) was an Australian rules footballer who played with South Melbourne and St Kilda in the Victorian Football League (VFL).

Notes

External links 

1895 births
1983 deaths
Australian rules footballers from Western Australia
Sydney Swans players
St Kilda Football Club players
East Fremantle Football Club players